Unión Deportiva Boadilla Las Rozas is a futsal club based in Las Rozas–Boadilla del Monte in Spain. Its home games are held in Pabellón Municipal, which has a capacity of 1,000 seats.

History
The club was founded in 2004 through a merger of Atlético Boadilla FS and CFS Las Rozas, taking the place of Atlético Boadilla in División de Honor. Las Rozas finished the 2004–05 season in 15th position, and was relegated to Division de Plata. In 2008, the club was forced to play in Primera Nacional A, due to economic limitations. In 2009, they reached an agreement with Ciudad de Móstoles FS to play home matches in Móstoles, playing as Boadilla Las Rozas/Móstoles Mirasierra. The partnership agreement ended in summer 2011.

For the 2011–12 season, UD Las Rozas Boadilla did not play with a first team, playing only with youth teams. The club returned for the 2012–13 season with a first team in Tercera División.

Season to season

1 seasons in Primera División
3 seasons in Segunda División
3 seasons in Segunda División B

Notable players
 Sergio Lozano
 Carlos Ortiz

References

External links
Official website
Official twitter
tecnicosfutbol.com profile

Futsal clubs in Spain
Futsal clubs established in 2004
2004 establishments in Spain
Boadilla del Monte
Sports teams in the Community of Madrid